Logan Gregory Wade (born 13 November 1991) is an Australian professional baseball player who plays for the Brisbane Bandits.

Career
In 2016 and 2017, Wade was a member of back-to-back Brisbane Bandits championship teams, and was awarded MVP for the 2017 Australian Baseball League Championship Series win over the Melbourne Aces.

International career 
He was a member of the Australia national baseball team in the Australian Challenge, 2017 World Baseball Classic Qualification in 2016, 2016 Haarlem Baseball Week, 2017 World Baseball Classic, 2018 exhibition games against Japan and 2019 WBSC Premier12.

References

External links

Logan Wade stats MiLB.com
Logan Wade stats ABL.com

1991 births
Living people
Australian expatriate baseball players in the United States
Baseball players from Brisbane
Baseball third basemen
Brisbane Bandits players
Cedar Rapids Kernels players
Elizabethton Twins players
Fort Myers Miracle players
Gulf Coast Twins players
2017 World Baseball Classic players
2023 World Baseball Classic players